Ronald Florijn (born 21 April 1961) is a former rower from the Netherlands and two-time Olympic gold medallist.

Florijn won the gold medal in the men's double sculls at the 1988 Summer Olympics, alongside Nico Rienks. At the 1996 Summer Olympics, he repeated his gold medal performance winning the eight with coxswain event with the Holland Acht (Holland Eight). He also won five medals at the world championships in 1978–1995 in double, four and eight-manned boat races.

He studied industrial and organizational psychology at the Leiden University and then worked for Arbo Unie, one of the biggest occupational health organizations in the Netherlands. Since 2004 he runs his own company. He is a knight of the Order of Orange-Nassau.

References

1961 births
Living people
Dutch male rowers
Rowers at the 1988 Summer Olympics
Rowers at the 1992 Summer Olympics
Rowers at the 1996 Summer Olympics
Olympic rowers of the Netherlands
Olympic gold medalists for the Netherlands
Sportspeople from Leiden
Olympic medalists in rowing
World Rowing Championships medalists for the Netherlands
Medalists at the 1996 Summer Olympics
Medalists at the 1988 Summer Olympics
20th-century Dutch people
21st-century Dutch people